Carl Garner Federal Lands Cleanup Day is a day observed in the United States to encourage nationwide citizen participation in the cleanup of federal lands.   It occurs on the first Saturday after Labor Day, and may include a variety of programs, ceremonies, and activities.  It was created in 1985 by the Federal Lands Cleanup Act as the "Federal Lands National Cleanup Day" and renamed in 1995 to honor Carl Garner and continue and expand his work of encouraging citizens to clean up Greers Ferry Lake and Little Red River in Arkansas.

External links
 Carl Garner
 National CleanUp Day
 National Environmental Education Foundation

References 

Environmental awareness days
Public holidays in the United States
September observances
Moveable holidays (US Labor Day date based)
Little Red River (Arkansas)
Arkansas culture